Albert William Wise (28 November 1884 – 30 May 1964), sometimes known as Micky Wise, was an English professional footballer who played as a goalkeeper in the Football League for Bradford City.

Career statistics

References

1884 births
1965 deaths
People from Olney, Buckinghamshire
English footballers
Association football goalkeepers
Wellingborough Town F.C. players
Chelsea F.C. players
Bradford City A.F.C. players
Brentford F.C. players
Bedford Town F.C. players
English Football League players
Southern Football League players
English expatriates in the United States